Clump Mountain is a national park in Queensland, Australia, 1287 km northwest of Brisbane.  It is part of the Coastal Wet Tropics Important Bird Area, identified as such by BirdLife International because of its importance for the conservation of lowland tropical rainforest birds. Here is an important habitat of the endangered southern cassowary, a large flightless bird, which has been recorded only in the tropical rainforests of Queensland and New Guinea.

Estimated altitude is 240 meters.

See also

 Protected areas of Queensland

References

National parks of Far North Queensland
Protected areas established in 1963
1963 establishments in Australia
Important Bird Areas of Queensland